Fran Tudor (born 27 September 1995) is a Croatian professional footballer who plays as a right-back or wing-back for Raków Częstochowa in the Ekstraklasa.

Club career
Born in Zagreb, Croatia, Tudor started his career with lower-tier side Mladost Buzin, originally playing as a forward, aged 10 he was spotted by GNK Dinamo Zagreb scouts and moved there, but two years later moved to NK Zagreb where he spent most of his youth career, moving gradually to a right back role. In 2014, he moved to Greece, joining the U20 side of Panathinaikos, where he was helped and mentored by Danijel Pranjić

After a year in Greece, Tudor moved back to Croatia, signing a three and a half-year contract with HNK Hajduk Split. Initially playing for the third-tier B team, where coach Mario Osibov moved him to a more offensive right wing role, he was moved to the first team by the newly appointed sports director/coach Goran Vučević for the match against HNK Rijeka on 18 April 2015, on which he debuted in the first team, scoring the leading goal from a header in the 44th minute in what would be a 1–2 loss for his team, before he was replaced in the 62nd minute by Josip Bašić.

On 27 December 2019, he signed a two and a half year deal with the option of prolonging it for another two years.

International career
He made his debut for Croatia in a January 2017 China Cup match against Chile, coming on as a 57th-minute substitute for Filip Ozobić, and earned a total of 3 caps, scoring no goals. His final international was a May 2017 friendly match against Mexico.

Personal life
Tudor is an alumnus of the XIII. High School in Zagreb. He is a distant cousin of Igor Tudor, both of them having roots in the village of Milna on the island of Hvar.

Career statistics

Club

International
Scores and results list Croatia's goal tally first.

Honours
Raków Częstochowa
 Polish Cup: 2020–21, 2021–22
 Polish Super Cup: 2021, 2022

References

External links
 
Fran Tudor at hajduk.hr

1995 births
Living people
Footballers from Zagreb
Association football fullbacks
Croatian footballers
Croatia youth international footballers
Croatia under-21 international footballers
Croatia international footballers
HNK Hajduk Split players
HNK Hajduk Split II players
Raków Częstochowa players
Croatian Football League players
Ekstraklasa players
Croatian expatriate footballers
Expatriate footballers in Greece
Croatian expatriate sportspeople in Greece
Expatriate footballers in Poland
Croatian expatriate sportspeople in Poland